André Bisson, OC (7 October 1929 – 25 November 2019) was a Canadian professor and businessman.

Biography
Bisson received an MBA from Harvard University. He became the Director of Business Administration at Université Laval after serving as a professor. He was also the Director of the Canadian Bankers Institute, and Managing Director of Scotiabank.

References

1929 births
2019 deaths
Businesspeople from Quebec
Canadian bankers
Harvard Business School alumni
Academic staff of Université Laval
French Quebecers
Officers of the Order of Canada
People from Trois-Rivières